Mwewe River is a tributary river of the Thuli River in Matabeleland South Province.Its source is near Figtree town in Plumtree. It flows through Kezi business centre. It has perennial pools that include Pedziba located just near Sibale mountain and the pool of Bhangwane located some 3kilometres from where the river crosses the Maphisa to Gwanda all weather road. Mwewe serves tens of farms along the way from Plumtree district up to the point where it joins Tuli river. Among the prominent of these is Walmer farm

Rivers of Zimbabwe